is a Japanese judoka from Tsukuba University.

Fukumi is a 4th dan in judo. She is the only judoka to have beaten Ryoko Tani twice. Later she won the gold medal in the extra-lightweight (-48 kg) division at the 2009 World Judo Championships. She is known for her seoinage, kouchigari, and newaza. In 2014, Fukumi took a year off to study abroad at Loughborough University.

External links
 
 
 

Japanese female judoka
1985 births
Living people
Asian Games medalists in judo
Judoka at the 2012 Summer Olympics
Olympic judoka of Japan
Judoka at the 2010 Asian Games
Asian Games silver medalists for Japan
Medalists at the 2010 Asian Games
Universiade medalists in judo
Universiade gold medalists for Japan
Medalists at the 2007 Summer Universiade
21st-century Japanese women